Bodoc is an unincorporated community in Avoyelles Parish, Louisiana, United States.

Etymology
Bodoc was named for a type of wood.

References

Unincorporated communities in Avoyelles Parish, Louisiana
Unincorporated communities in Louisiana